The 2016–17 season was Liverpool Football Club's 125th season in existence and their 55th consecutive season in the top flight of English football. It was also the club's 25th consecutive season in the Premier League. Along with the Premier League, Liverpool also competed in the FA Cup and EFL Cup. The season covered the period from 13 August 2016 to 21 May 2017. It started with a 4–3 away win against Arsenal and ended with a 3–0 home win against relegated Middlesbrough, which secured the Reds a place in the top four and qualification to the UEFA Champions League playoff round.

Season review

Pre-season

Liverpool began their pre-season on 8 July away at Tranmere Rovers. Danny Ings scored the only goal in a 1–0 win. 
Five days later, the Reds travelled to the Highbury Stadium to face League One side Fleetwood Town. New signing Marko Grujić scored the opening goal on his debut, followed by a goal apiece by Lucas Leiva and 16-year-old debutant Ben Woodburn before two goals by Roberto Firmino rounded out the 5–0 win. Liverpool won their third successive pre-season match on 17 July, with Ings and Woodburn scoring in a 2–0 win over Wigan Athletic. On 20 July, Liverpool defeated Huddersfield Town 2–0 through goals from Alberto Moreno and Grujić; reserve goalkeeper Shamal George also featured in the last 25 minutes of the match as a striker.

Liverpool began their campaign in the International Champions Cup on 28 July, conceding a 0–1 defeat against Chelsea. On 30 July, Liverpool defeated Milan 2–0 with goals from Divock Origi and Firmino. Liverpool then played the final pre-season match in the United States against Roma, suffering a 2–1 defeat. On 6 August, Liverpool played Barcelona at the Wembley Stadium in the final match of the International Champions Cup and won 4–0, with summer signing Sadio Mané getting on the scoresheet along with Origi and Grujić, and former Liverpool player Javier Mascherano scoring an own goal. Liverpool's pre-season ended the following day with a 4–0 defeat at Mainz 05's Opel Arena.

August
Liverpool began the season with a visit to the Emirates Stadium on 14 August to face-off with Arsenal. Arsenal opened the scoring with a Theo Walcott strike in the 31st minute, one minute after the Arsenal striker saw his penalty kick saved by Liverpool goalkeeper Simon Mignolet, but a free-kick by Philippe Coutinho drew the scoreline level just before the break. The Reds continued the momentum into the second half and were 4–1 up after 63 minutes through strikes from Adam Lallana, Coutinho and Mané. Two quickfire goals from Alex Oxlade-Chamberlain and Calum Chambers in response caused a nervy end to the match, but the Reds were able to see out the 4–3 victory. Liverpool played their second league match away at Burnley on 20 August. Liverpool dominated possession throughout, but was unable to recover from calamitous defending in the first half and suffered a 2–0 defeat. On 23 August, Liverpool began their quest for the EFL Cup in a match against Burton Albion at the Pirelli Stadium. A brace from Daniel Sturridge, an own goal from Tom Naylor and a goal apiece from Firmino and Origi saw a 5–0 win and progression to the next round of the competition. On 27 August, Liverpool played away to Tottenham Hotspur in the Premier League. A James Milner penalty had the Reds 1–0 up at half-time, but a Danny Rose equalizer in the 72nd minute caused the match to end in a 1–1 draw.

September
 
On 10 September, after the international break, Liverpool hosted defending champions Leicester City at Anfield. Liverpool were 2–0 up within 30 minutes through goals from Firmino and Mané, but a fumbling of the ball at the back by Lucas Leiva allowed Jamie Vardy to narrow the lead before the break. However, a goal by Lallana in the 56th minute restored the two-goal lead, and Firmino's second goal of the match in the closing stages saw out a 4–1 win. The match was played before Anfield's largest crowd since 1977, with a 54,000 sell-out in the newly expanded stadium. Liverpool then played away at Stamford Bridge against Chelsea on 16 September, winning 2–1. Dejan Lovren's close range finish in the 17th minute and skipper Jordan Henderson's spectacular 25-yard strike in the 36th were enough to secure the 3 points. Liverpool played against Derby County at the Pride Park Stadium in the third round of the EFL Cup on 20 September. They defeated the Rams 3–0 with Ragnar Klavan scoring his first goal for the club, with Coutinho and Origi also getting on the scoresheet. On 24 September, Liverpool made it three wins in a row in the Premier League when they bested Hull City 5–1 at Anfield through strikes from Lallana, Mané, Coutinho and two converted penalties by Milner.

October
On 1 October, Liverpool defeated Swansea City 2–1 at the Liberty Stadium. A poor first-half saw the Reds down at the break, but a vast improvement in the second half with goals coming from Firmino and a late penalty by Milner were enough to secure the three points. Liverpool faced Manchester United at Anfield on 17 October. The North-West derby was largely forgettable and ended in a 0–0 draw, with Liverpool securing their first clean sheet in the league of the season in a match of few chances. Liverpool then hosted West Bromwich Albion at Anfield on 22 October, winning 2–1. The Reds controlled the game and were 2–0 up at half-time through goals from Mané and Coutinho, but a late Gareth McAuley strike narrowed the scoreline to 2–1. On 25 October, Liverpool played Tottenham Hotspur at Anfield in the fourth round of the EFL Cup. The Reds won 2–1 with a brace from Sturridge seeing them through to the quarter-finals of the competition. Liverpool saw out October with a match against Crystal Palace at Selhurst Park on the 29th. Emre Can, Lovren, Joël Matip and Firmino scored for the Reds in the thrilling encounter which ended 4–2.

November
Liverpool faced Watford at Anfield on 6 November. The Reds defeated the Hornets 6–1 with Mané bagging a brace, Coutinho, Can and Firmino getting on the scoresheet and Georginio Wijnaldum scoring his first goal for the club. This result put Liverpool top of the Premier League for the first time since April 2014. Following the international break, Liverpool faced Southampton away at St Mary's Stadium on 19 November. The Reds controlled the match but were unable to break down the Saints defence as the match ended 0–0. On 26 November, Liverpool hosted Sunderland at Anfield. Origi made the breakthrough for the Reds in the 75th minute and Milner converted a penalty in the closing stages of the match to see out a 2–0 victory. Ben Woodburn made his debut for Liverpool when he came on as a substitute for Wijnaldum in the 92nd minute. Three days later, on 29 November, Liverpool hosted Leeds United at Anfield in the fifth round of the EFL Cup. Origi opened the scoring in the 76th minute and Woodburn's volley in the box in the 81st saw out a 2–0 victory and progression to the semi-finals of the competition. Woodburn's goal at the age of 17 years and 45 days old made him Liverpool's youngest ever goalscorer, surpassing Michael Owen's record by 99 days.

December
Liverpool faced AFC Bournemouth at Dean Court on 4 December. Mané and Origi scored one apiece in the first half and Can scored another in the second half to see the Reds to a 3–1 lead, but three goals from Bournemouth in the final 20 minutes of the match caused Liverpool to suffer a 3–4 defeat. Liverpool then faced West Ham United at Anfield on 11 December, drawing 2–2. On 14 December, Liverpool travelled to the Riverside Stadium to face Middlesbrough. Lallana bagged a brace and created another for Origi to see the Reds to a 3–0 victory. Next up was Everton, the Merseyside Derby, on 19 December. Mané scored the winning and only goal in the 94th minute. Liverpool then faced Stoke City. Stoke rapidly opened the score in the 12th minute, but an equaliser from Lallana and a goal from Firmino made the Reds lead at half-time. In the second half, an own goal by Giannelli Imbula and a goal from Sturridge ensured a 4–1 Reds win. On 31 December, Liverpool hosted Manchester City, with the Reds winning 1–0 thanks to a header by Wijnaldum in the eighth minute.

January

Liverpool went to play Sunderland, where Sturridge opened the scoring with a header, but minutes later Jermain Defoe levelled it from the spot so that it would go 1–1 at half-time. Mané scored another for 2–1 in the 71st minute, but ten minutes later, he handled the ball in the penalty area with the referee pointing to the spot. Defoe scored once again and the match ended level, with the reds missing out important points. On 8 January, Liverpool played a goalless draw against Plymouth Argyle in the third round of the FA Cup. The match was marked with the Reds fielding the youngest starting 11 in their history. Liverpool then faced Southampton, on 11 January, in the EFL Cup semi-finals first leg at St Mary's, losing the game 1–0 with Redmond scoring the only goal in 20th minute. Three days later, the Reds faced Manchester United at Old Trafford. Milner opened the scoring from the spot in the 26th minute, after Paul Pogba handled the ball in the box. In the 84th minute, Zlatan Ibrahimović levelled the match 1–1. Liverpool were up to play the replay with Plymouth on the 18th. A goal by Lucas Leiva in the 17th minute made them earn their first and last win in January. Later in this month, Liverpool hosted Swansea City in the Premier League. Early in the second half, two fast goals by Fernando Llorente gave Swansea the commanding position. However, Liverpool levelled through Firmino in the 54th and 69th minute. Gylfi Sigurðsson finished a shot in the back of the net for 2–3. On 25 January, Liverpool hosted Southampton in the second leg of the EFL Cup semi-final. They dominated the match, made some good chances, including a shot by Can cleared off the line by Southampton goalkeeper Fraser Forster. At the stoppage time, Shane Long sealed the win for the Saints with a goal to make the aggregate score 2–0. The bad month for Liverpool continued, as they were eliminated from the FA Cup after a 1–2 home loss to Wolverhampton Wanderers. The Reds ended the month with a 1–1 home draw to Chelsea in the Premier League, where David Luiz opened the scoring with a free-kick, just to leave it for Wijnaldum to level in the 58th. Diego Costa saw his penalty shot stopped by Mignolet in the 78th minute.

February
Liverpool started February with a 2–0 loss away to Hull City, which was Mane's first game after Senegal lost in the quarter-finals of the 2017 Africa Cup of Nations. The goals for Hull came from Alfred N'Diaye just before the break and Oumar Niasse in the 84th minute. One week later, the Reds won for the first time since five matches in the Premier League, with two Mané goals in two minutes sealing the 2–0 win for the Merseyside team against Spurs. On 27 February, Liverpool lost 3–1 away to Leicester in the first match for their new manager Craig Shakespeare following the sacking of the title-winning Claudio Ranieri. Jamie Vardy opened the scoring with Danny Drinkwater making it two before the break. Early in the second half, Vardy scored his second goal of the night to see his team leading 3–0, and Coutinho made the final result in the 69th minute.

March
On 4 March, Liverpool continued their winning ways against fellow top six teams with a 3–1 home victory over Arsenal. The Reds were 2–0 up at the break with goals from Firmino in the ninth minute and Mané in the 40th, but Danny Welbeck halved the Liverpool lead with a goal in the 57th minute. In the stoppage time, Wijnaldum sealed the match off, making it 3–1 following a low cross by Origi from the right. Liverpool then went on to win a vital three points home against Burnley on 12 March, winning 2–1. After falling down to an Ashley Barnes strike early in the match, Wijnaldum equalized in the stoppage time of the first half just seconds before the half's end, and in the 64th minute, Can gave Liverpool the lead with a long-range shot that ended up out of the grasp of goalkeeper Tom Heaton. On 19 March, Liverpool traveled to Manchester City for a crucial game in the battle for Champions League qualification. Milner opened the scoring from the spot in the 51st minute, though Sergio Agüero leveled at the 69th. Both sides missed many chances, including a mishit by Lallana from five yards, but by the end, the draw was considered a fair result.

April
Liverpool started their month on 1 April against Everton in the Merseyside Derby at Anfield. Mané put Liverpool ahead, but Matthew Pennington drew Everton level in the 28th minute. The host Reds regained the lead two minutes and 57 seconds later with a strike from Coutinho. Origi, a substitute for the injured Mané, added a third goal just minutes after being introduced and the scoreline remained 3–1 till the final whistle. The second fixture was on 5 April against AFC Bournemouth at Anfield. Benik Afobe scored early for the visiting Cherries off a back-pass mishap from Wijnaldum. However, Coutinho drew the match level at 1–1 with a goal in the 40th minute. The Reds struck first in the second half with a goal from Origi, assisted by Wijnaldum, in the 59th. Bournemouth was able to draw the game level through a late Joshua King goal putting the score at 2–2, which the match finished. The day before their upcoming fixture, an away match at Stoke City, Klopp confirmed Mané would ruled out for the remainder of Liverpool's season. Liverpool had no time to dwell upon this as Stoke awaited the following day. With a side featuring youth players such as Trent Alexander-Arnold and Woodburn, Liverpool fell behind 1–0 at the half following a Jonathan Walters goal just before the break. However, the introduction of Firmino and Coutinho at half-time led to responses in the 70th and 72nd minutes, where Coutinho then Firmino respectively scored to put the scoreline at 1–2. The Reds saw the match out, marking their first away victory of the calendar year in the Premier League. Liverpool's April continued with a match at West Brom, where the sole goal came from Firmino off a set piece header in first-half injury time. The final fixture of the month was a return to Anfield to square-off with Crystal Palace. Coutinho opened the scoring in the 24th minute off a free-kick, however former Liverpool man Christian Benteke leveled the match then scored a second in the 74th to hand Liverpool a 1–2 loss, just their second Premier League home defeat of the season.

May

The final month of the season for Liverpool began on 7 May with a home match against Southampton. The result was a 0–0 draw, with the best chance coming to the Reds through a 66th-minute penalty that was taken by Milner and ultimately missed. The kick came just moments after Southampton goalkeeper Fraser Forster approached Milner as he put the ball on the spot seemingly in an attempt to win a psychological advantage before the penalty. This draw resulted in the fourth match against Southampton out of four played in this season where Liverpool failed to score. The penultimate match of the season (and final away match) was on 14 May, a visit at Olympic Stadium to face West Ham. The Reds struck first in the 35th minute thanks to Sturridge's finish following what was described as a "sublime" pass from Coutinho. In the second half, Coutinho scored twice in four minutes and Origi's goal in the 76th minute capped off a 0–4 victory.

The final match of the season took place on 21 May, at Anfield against Middlesbrough. While Middlesbrough were already guaranteed relegation and a Premier League finish of 19th, Liverpool sat in fourth place at the time of kick-off, with Arsenal just one point behind and Manchester City two points ahead, with a win guaranteeing Liverpool a spot in the UEFA Champions League for next season. The match stayed at 0–0 for the first 45 minutes, however Wijnaldum found a breakthrough for the Reds in first-half stoppage time, putting Liverpool up 1–0 at the half. Coutinho added a second just six minutes into the second half and that goal was followed by a third from Lallana just five minutes after that putting Liverpool up 3–0, where the scoreline would remain. Liverpool clinched fourth place in the final Premier League table to secure Champions League football for the 2017–18 season.

First team
As it stands on 21 May 2017

Last updated on 1 February 2017

New contracts

Transfers and loans
Transfers in

Transfers out

Loans out

Transfer summarySpendingSummer:  £ 67,900,000

Winter:  £ 0

Total:  £ 67,900,000IncomeSummer:  £ 72,800,000

Winter:  £ 5,750,000

Total:  £ 78,550,000Net Expenditure'''

Summer:  £ 4,900,000

Winter:  £ 5,750,000

Total:  £ 10,650,000

Friendlies

Pre-season

International Champions Cup

During season

Post-season

Competitions

Overall

Overview

{| class="wikitable" style="text-align: center"
|-
!rowspan=2|Competition
!colspan=8|Record
|-
!
!
!
!
!
!
!
!
|-
| Premier League

|-
| FA Cup

|-
| EFL Cup

|-
! Total

Premier League

League table

Results summary

Results by matchday

Matches

On 15 June 2016, the fixtures for the forthcoming season were announced.

 FA Cup 

EFL Cup

Squad statistics
Appearances
Numbers in parentheses denote appearances as substitute.
Players with no appearances not included in the list.

Goalscorers
Includes all competitive matches.

Clean sheets
Includes all competitive matches. The list is sorted alphabetically by surname when total clean sheets are equal.Correct as of matches played on 21 May 2017Disciplinary record

Club awards

End-of-season awards
The 2017 Liverpool FC Players' Awards event was held at Anfield on 9 May 2017.

Liverpool Players' Player of the Year Award: Sadio Mané
Liverpool Supporters' Player of the Year Award: Sadio Mané
Liverpool Supporters' Young Player of the Year Award: Trent Alexander-Arnold
Goal of the Season Award: Emre Can (vs. Watford, 1 May 2017)
Academy’s Players’ Player of the Year: Ben Woodburn
Liverpool Ladies FC Players’ Player of the Season: Sophie Ingle
Lifetime Achievement Award: Roger Hunt
Bill Shankly Community Award:  Jeremy Barnes
Supporters’ Club of the Year: Cyprus
Staff Recognition Award: Disability support team
Special Recognition Award: Lucas Leiva
Outstanding Team Achievement Award: Rome 1977 team

Liverpool Standard Chartered Player of the Month awardAwarded monthly to the player that was chosen by fans voting on liverpoolfc.com''

References

Liverpool
Liverpool F.C. seasons